Madam X is a 1994 Hindi crime drama film directed by Deepak Shivdasani and featuring Rekha, Mohsin Khan, Shakti Kapoor and Raza Murad in important roles.

Plot 
Police officer Vijay captures a lady don, Madam X and sends her in a secret custody. He wants to gather more where about of Madam X's gang. He approaches Sonu Anjali, a poor girl Killed look alike of Madam X to enter into the criminal gang so that she can provide him information of their activities.

Cast 
 Mohsin Khan as Inspector Vijay 
 Rekha as Anjali Before Surgery / Sonu Nani Twins Mothers / Rekha Duplicate Appearance Madam X Died Rekha killed  *Sushmita Sen Madam X  Priya  Duplicate Daughter
 Shakti Kapoor as Chapaklal (Comeo Role)
 Raza Murad as Rai Bahadur
 Jagdeep as Zankar
 Avtar Gill as Inspector  Deshpande Died / Rana Deshpandey  in Madam X 2 Sequel
 Parikshit Sahni as Police Commissioner Mathur
 Kiran Juneja Neeta After Surgery   
 Jaya Mathur Nirmala Sister Anjali  Sonu Priya Madam X Raju brother
 Pankaj Dheer Mohan Card games Money (Guest Appearance)

Songs 
"Shaadi Shuda Mardon Ko" – Alka Yagnik
"Main Hoon Churi Rampuri" – Kavita Krishnamurthy
"Kaise Dil Jeete Aap Ka" (Male) – Anu Malik
"Kaise Dil Jeete Aap Ka" (Female) – Alka Yagnik
"Madam X Madam X" – Alisha Chinai
"Madam X Madam X" – Instrumental

References

External links 
 

1994 films
1994 crime drama films
1990s Hindi-language films
1990s action films
Films about organised crime in India
Films scored by Anu Malik
Films directed by Deepak Shivdasani